The 1824 New York gubernatorial election was held from November 1 to 3, 1824, to elect the governor and the lieutenant governor.

Candidates
The Clintonian faction of the Democratic-Republican Party nominated incumbent DeWitt Clinton for Governor and state assemblyman and former U.S. representative James Tallmadge Jr. for Lieutenant Governor.

The anti-Clintonian faction of the Democratic-Republican Party nominated Erie Canal Commissioner Samuel Young for Governor and incumbent Erastus Root for Lieutenant Governor.

Results
The Clintonian ticket of Clinton and Tallmadge won.

Sources
Result: The Tribune Almanac 1841

1824
New York
Gubernatorial election
November 1824 events